The first season of the American television comedy Abbott Elementary created by Quinta Brunson, premiered in the United States on ABC on December 7, 2021, concluded on April 12, 2022, and consisted of thirteen episodes. The series sees the introduction of characters portrayed by Brunson, Tyler James Williams, Janelle James, Lisa Ann Walter, Chris Perfetti, and Sheryl Lee Ralph.
 
Abbott Elementary is presented in a mockumentary format similar to one of The Office and Modern Family, and follows a documentary crew recording the lives of teachers working in underfunded schools including the fictional Willard R. Abbott Elementary School, a predominantly Black Philadelphia public school.

The season holds a 98% approval rating from critics and audiences alike on Rotten Tomatoes, gaining universal acclaim. The success of the season ultimately led to a second season renewal in March 2022.

Cast and characters

Main 
 Quinta Brunson as Janine Teagues
 Tyler James Williams as Gregory Eddie
 Janelle James as Ava Coleman
 Lisa Ann Walter as Melissa Schemmenti
 Chris Perfetti as Jacob Hill
 Sheryl Lee Ralph as Barbara Howard

Recurring 
 William Stanford Davis as Mr. Johnson
 Zack Fox as Tariq Temple

Guest 
 Kate Peterman as Tina Schwartz
 Jim Gardner as himself
 Nate' Jones as Amber
 Levi Mynatt as Will
 Brian Scolaro as Vinny
 Lela Hoffmeister as Courtney
 George Sharperson as Wendell
 Bruno Amato as Gary
 Richard Brooks as Gerald
 Mitra Jouhari as Sahar
 Orlando Jones as Martin Eddie
 Iyana Halley as Taylor Howard
 Reggie Hayes as Denzel Collins
 Larry Owens as Zach
 Ambrit Millhouse as Alley Williams
 Shirley Jordan as Delisha Sloss

Episodes

Production

Development 

In May 2021, Abbott Elementary was given a series order. The season is distributed by Disney Platform Distribution and Warner Bros. Domestic Television Distribution, while being produced by Delicious Non-Sequitur, 20th Television and Warner Bros. Television. The first season released onto DVD and various online platforms including Amazon Prime, Apple TV & Vudu on October 18, 2022.

In an interview, director and producer Randall Einhorn spoke about how the series works with the mockumentary format:

On March 14, 2022, due to the success of the series, a second season was green-lit by ABC months before the first season was set to conclude. Brunson, Einhorn, Justin Halpern and Patrick Schumacker all returned as executive producers.

Casting 
In March 2021, Tyler James Williams, Janelle James, Lisa Ann Walter, Chris Perfetti, and Sheryl Lee Ralph were announced to star as regular cast members; alongside Brunson, who was confirmed to star upon the series announcement.

In addition to the main cast, the series sees William Stanford David and Zack Fox recur as Mr. Johnson and Tariq Temple respectively. Tariq is Janine's slightly selfish and so-called "feminist" boyfriend, whom she dates throughout the duration of the season. After backlash from the staff of Abbott, Janine ultimately breaks up with him during the season finale. When asked about the relationship of Tariq and Janine, and why she wrote him the way she did, Brunson stated:

The second episode of the season, "Light Bulb", features a short cameo from Philadelphia  ABC Channel 6 Action News anchor Jim Gardner, who appears during the cold open; beloved by the staff of Abbott. Another Philadelphia celebrity, Gritty of the Philadelphia Flyers, was originally supposed to appear during the pilot episode, but was unable due to scheduling conflicts.

Filming 
Filming began on August 16, 2021, in Los Angeles, California, and concluded on November 5, 2021. The interior scenes of the series are filmed at  Warner Bros. Studios, Burbank in Burbank, California, with exterior shots of the series being filmed in front of Vermont Elementary School in Los Angeles. In August, three crew members tested positive for COVID-19 but production was not impacted.

Reception

Critical response 

For the first season, Metacritic, which uses a weighted average, assigned a score of 80 out of 100 based on 16 critics, indicating "generally favorable reviews". Angie Han of The Hollywood Reporter said the first episodes "[are] a willingness to deal with class head on, while also finding humor in the characters' situations", and concluded that Abbott Elementary is "crowd-pleasing."

Ratings 
The series premiered on December 7, 2021. New episodes aired at 9:30 p.m. (EST) weekly prior to the premiere of new episodes of Black-ish; which was in its final season. Including viewership recorded over a 35-day period through "linear and digital platforms" (known as MP35) after its original broadcast, the pilot episode on December 7, 2021, increased to a 2.4 demographic rating, with 7.1 million viewers. ABC said the 300% increase was its "largest percentage growth for any new comedy premiere". The viewership of the second episode, "Light Bulb", increased by 5.6 million viewers to 9 million after 35 days. Per The Hollywood Reporter, the first season of Abbott Elementary ranked 66 in broadcast television ratings for the 2021-22 season, and scored a 3.84 average million viewers.

Notes

References

External links 

2021 American television seasons
2022 American television seasons